Mealrigg is a small settlement in the civil parish of Westnewton, close to the boundary with the civil parish of Holme St. Cuthbert in Cumbria, United Kingdom.

Mealrigg is situated one mile north-west of Westnewton, a quarter-of-a-mile east of New Cowper, and half-a-mile south of Aikshaw. Other nearby settlements include Jericho, Tarns, and Langrigg.

Historically, Mealrigg formed part of the township of Langrigg and Mealrigg.

Etymology
The name Mealrigg comes from the Old English middle-hrycg, meaning a middle ridge. There are several recorded variant spellings, including Midelrig,  Meldrige,  Milrig,  and Meldrigg.

Governance
Mealrigg is part of the parliamentary constituency of Workington. In the December 2019 general election, the Tory candidate for Workington, Mark Jenkinson, was elected the MP, overturning a 9.4 per cent Labour majority from the 2017 election to eject shadow environment secretary Sue Hayman by a margin of 4,136 votes. Until the December 2019 general election The Labour Party has won the seat in the constituency in every general election since 1979.The Conservative Party has only been elected once in Workington since World War II, at the 1976 by-election.

Before Brexit, it was in the North West England European Parliamentary Constituency.

References

External links
 Cumbria County History Trust: Langrigg and Mealrigg (nb: provisional research only – see Talk page)

Hamlets in Cumbria
Allerdale